The Five Pennies is a semi-biographical 1959 film starring Danny Kaye as jazz cornet player and bandleader Loring "Red" Nichols. Other cast members include Barbara Bel Geddes, Louis Armstrong, Harry Guardino, Bob Crosby, Bobby Troup, Susan Gordon, and Tuesday Weld. The film was directed by Melville Shavelson.

The film received four Oscar nominations: Best Musical Scoring (Leith Stevens), Best Original Song (Sylvia Fine—Danny Kaye's wife), Best Cinematography (Daniel L. Fapp), and Best Costumes (Edith Head).

The real Red Nichols recorded all of Kaye's cornet playing for the film soundtrack. The other musicians in Red's band were not asked to provide their musical contributions, and the sound of his band was supplied by session players.

Plot
Red Nichols (Kaye) is a small-town cornet player who moves to New York City in the 1920s and finds work in a band led by Wil Paradise (Crosby). He meets and marries singer Willia Stutsman, a.k.a. "Bobbie Meredith" (Bel Geddes). Red and his friends Jimmy Dorsey, Glenn Miller, Artie Schutt and Dave Tough form their own Dixieland band called "The Five Pennies" (a play on Nichols' name, since a nickel equals five pennies). As their popularity peaks, the Nichols' young daughter Dorothy (Susan Gordon) contracts polio, and the family leaves the music business, moving to the balmier climate of Los Angeles, where Nichols works in the shipyards and both parents help Dorothy work on her recovery.

As a teenager, Dorothy (Tuesday Weld) learns of her father's music career and persuades him to make a comeback. His first attempts to play a horn (he threw his own treasured instrument into the San Francisco Bay in despair when Dorothy was ill) are a miserable failure. Eventually he listens to his wife and daughter, and practice restores his skill. His old friend Tony Valani (Guardino), now a huge success, gets him a gig to perform at a small club, with The New Five Pennies. Nichols, nervous and terrified of splitting his lip, is disappointed when he sees no other old friends in the audience. He opens the show, and after a few notes, “Won't you come home Bill Bailey?” echoes through the dark. The lights comes up, and it is Satchmo and his friends. Willa comes up on stage and tells him she has a surprise for him. Dorothy steps onto the dance floor without her cane and asks her father to dance. Willa sings “This little penny is to wish on...” while they do. Then Nichols takes his horn and plays “Glory Hallelujah!” His friends join in.

Cast
 Danny Kaye as Red Nichols
 Barbara Bel Geddes as Willa Stutsman (her singing voice is dubbed by Eileen Wilson)
 Louis Armstrong as himself
 Harry Guardino as Tony Valani
 Bob Crosby as Will Paradise
 Bobby Troup as Arthur Schutt
 Susan Gordon as Dorothy Nichols - Ages 6 to 8
 Tuesday Weld as Dorothy Nichols - Age 13 to 14
 Ray Anthony as Jimmy Dorsey
 Shelly Manne as Dave Tough
 Ray Daley as Glenn Miller
 Valerie Allen as Tommye Eden
 Bob Hope as himself (cameo)

Music
Eleven composers are credited in the film.

Reception
New York Times critic A.H. Weiler wrote that the "solicitous dramatization of the harried life and times of that noted jazz man, Loring (Red) Nichols, the tune-filled story... is highly palatable schmaltz served up with a Dixieland beat by some authentic performers, musical and otherwise." He found Kaye's performance particularly fine on many levels.

See also
 List of American films of 1959

References

External links

 

1959 films
1950s biographical films
American biographical films
American musical drama films
Biographical films about musicians
Films directed by Melville Shavelson
Films scored by Leith Stevens
Films set in New York City
Films set in the 1920s
Films set in the 1930s
Films set in the 1940s
Paramount Pictures films
Cultural depictions of jazz musicians
1950s English-language films
1950s American films